Hossein Nateghi (born 8 February 1987) is an Iranian cyclist, who most recently rode for UCI Continental team .

Major results

2005
1st Time trial, Asian Junior Road Championships
2006
1st Stage 1 Milad de Nour Tour
2007
1st Overall Taftan Tour
1st Prologue & Stage 2
1st Prologue Tour of Turkey
2008
1st Overall Taftan Tour
1st Stages 1 & 2 
 UAE International Emirates Post Tour
1st Stages 1 & 2
 Tour of Thailand
1st Stages 1 & 4
1st Stage 4 Kerman Tour
2009
1st Stage 6 Tour of Thailand
 Jelajah Malaysia
1st Stages 3 & 8
1st Stage 4 Tour de Singkarak
1st Stage 5 President Tour of Iran
1st Stage 3 Tour of Iran (Azerbaijan)
3rd Road race, National Road Championshios
2010
 Kerman Tour
1st Stages 1 (TTT) & 5
1st Stage 1 Milad De Nour Tour
3rd Road race, Asian Road Championships
2011
 Milad De Nour Tour
1st Stages 2 & 4
2012
1st Stage 2 Tour de East Java
1st Stage 3 Tour de Brunei
2018
 1st Stage 2 Milad De Nour Tour

References

External links

1987 births
Living people
Iranian male cyclists
Asian Games medalists in cycling
Cyclists at the 2006 Asian Games
Cyclists at the 2014 Asian Games
Medalists at the 2006 Asian Games
Asian Games silver medalists for Iran
People from Sanandaj
21st-century Iranian people